Scathophaga suilla is a species of fly in the family Scathophagidae. It is found in the  Palearctic .

References

Scathophagidae
Insects described in 1794
Muscomorph flies of Europe